Bandiin Dambiinyam (July 15, 1923 – October 9, 2001), State Merited Architect
(Монгол улсын гавьат архитектор)

Dambiinyam broke with Soviet-influenced Socialist architecture by incorporating elements of traditional Mongolian design in his work, such as the Urt Tsagaan service district; the pavilion for the Pioneer Palace; the facades of State Department Store, Bacteriological Institute, and 'Gutalyn 22' residential apartments; the B. Tserendorj monument; and the Mongolian traditional felt ‘ger’ home design on the dome of the State Bank building. 

Many of Dambiinyam's projects focused on public services such as the Orphan Center and School; the Ministry of Geology, Mining, and Industry; the Chingeltei District Fire Station; the Vystavka Exhibition Center; city halls; hotels; and health and wellness resorts throughout the Mongolian countryside.

1933-1941 Secondary school, Altanbulag, Selenge
1941-1946 Ministry of the Interior, Ulaanbaatar
1946-1956 Moscow Architectural Institute
1956-1957 Architect, City Planning, Ulaanbaatar
1956-1963 Founding Member, Union of Mongolian Architects
1957-1961 Director, Mongolian Architects Institute
1961-1967 Professor and Dean, Architecture, Mongolian State University, Ulaanbaatar
1967-1971 Director, Architectural Research Institute
1971-1984 Professor and Dean, Polytechnic University, Ulaanbaatar
1984-2001 Professor Emeritus, Mongolian State University, Ulaanbaatar
1984-2001 Architect Consultant, various projects

References

1923 births
2001 deaths
Mongolian architects
Academic staff of Moscow Architectural Institute